Mads Frøkjær-Jensen (born 29 July 1999) is a Danish professional footballer who plays as an attacking midfielder for Danish Superliga club OB.

Career

OB
Frøkjær joined OB in 2014. On 19 December 2017, Frøkjær signed a three-year professional contract active from the summer 2018, which also meant, that he would be promoted permanently to the first team squad. He made his official debut on 6 September 2018, Frøkjær got his debut for the first team of OB in the Danish Cup. He started on the bench, before replacing Nicklas Helenius in the 73rd minute in a 4–0 victory against Akademisk Boldklub.

Frøkjær made his Danish Superliga debut on 14 April 2019 against FC Midtjylland coming in from the bench with 17 minutes left. He played a total of five games for the first team in the 2018–19 season. On 24 January 2020, OB confirmed that Frøkjær had signed a contract extension until the summer 2024.

References

External links
Mads Frøkjær-Jensen at OB
Mads Frøkjær-Jensen at DBU

Danish men's footballers
Danish Superliga players
Denmark youth international footballers
1999 births
Living people
Odense Boldklub players
Association football midfielders
People from Hvidovre Municipality
Hvidovre IF players
Greve Fodbold players
Avedøre IF players
Sportspeople from the Capital Region of Denmark